The 2016 Copa Sudamericana Finals were scheduled to be the two-legged final that would decide the winner of the 2016 Copa Sudamericana, the 15th edition of the Copa Sudamericana, South America's secondary international club football tournament organized by CONMEBOL.

The finals were scheduled to be contested in two-legged home-and-away format between Colombian team Atlético Nacional and Brazilian team Chapecoense. The first leg was scheduled to be hosted by Atletico Nacional at Estadio Atanasio Girardot in Medellín on 30 November 2016, while the second leg was scheduled to be hosted by Chapecoense at Estádio Couto Pereira in Curitiba on 7 December 2016. The winner would earn the right to play against the 2016 Copa Libertadores winners in the 2017 Recopa Sudamericana, and against the 2016 J. League Cup winners in the 2017 Suruga Bank Championship. They also automatically qualified for the 2017 Copa Libertadores group stage.

The finals were suspended after the crash of LaMia Flight 2933, carrying the majority of the Chapecoense squad on their way to the first leg of the finals. CONMEBOL awarded the title to Chapecoense on 5 December 2016, following a request by Atlético Nacional.

Teams

Atlético Nacional would have the chance to complete the Copa Libertadores and Copa Sudamericana season double, having won the Copa Libertadores title earlier in 2016, while this would be the first South American club final for Chapecoense.

Road to the finals

Note: In all scores below, the score of the home team is given first.

Format

The final would be played on a home-and-away two-legged basis, with the higher-seeded team hosting the second leg. If tied on aggregate, the away goals rule would not be used, and 30 minutes of extra time would be played. If still tied after extra time, the penalty shoot-out would be used to determine the winner.

LaMia Flight 2933 crash

On 28 November 2016, LaMia Flight 2933, carrying the Chapecoense squad to the first leg, crashed on the way to the José María Córdova International Airport. There were 71 fatalities, including 19 of the 22 Chapecoense players on the plane. CONMEBOL immediately suspended all activities, including the scheduled final matches, in the early morning of 29 November.

In light of these events, Atlético Nacional requested that CONMEBOL award the title to Chapecoense. As requested, CONMEBOL awarded Chapecoense the title of the 2016 Copa Sudamericana, their first continental title, on 5 December, while Atlético Nacional received the "CONMEBOL Centenario Fair Play" award for their gesture.

Match details

First leg
 
Atlético Nacional invited fans to the Estadio Atanasio Girardot dressed in white with candles at the scheduled time of the first leg, to pay tribute in memory to the victims of the crash. A vigil was held on the same night at Chapecoense's stadium, the Arena Condá.

Second leg

Services were held in both the Estádio Couto Pereira, and Chapecoense's stadium, the Arena Condá, on the night that the second leg was scheduled.

See also
 2017 Recopa Sudamericana
 2017 Suruga Bank Championship
 List of accidents involving sports teams

References

External links
 Copa Sudamericana 2016, CONMEBOL.com 

Finals
2016
2016 in Colombian football
2016 in Brazilian football
Atlético Nacional matches
Associação Chapecoense de Futebol matches
LaMia Flight 2933
November 2016 sports events in South America
December 2016 sports events in South America
Cancelled association football competitions